Huntington Municipal Airport  is a county-owned, public-use airport located three nautical miles (3.5 mi, 5.6 km) northeast of the central business district of Huntington, a town in Emery County, Utah, United States.

Facilities and aircraft 
Huntington Municipal Airport covers an area of 333 acres (135 ha) at an elevation of 5,915 feet (1,803 m) above mean sea level. It has three runways:
8/26 (formerly 7/25) is 4,048 by 75 feet (1,234 x 23 m) with an asphalt surface; 12/30 is 3,640 by 70 feet (1,109 x 21 m) with a dirt surface; 18/36 is 2,079 by 56 feet (634 x 17 m) with a dirt surface. For the 12-month period ending December 31, 2007, the airport had 1,724 aircraft operations, an average of 143 per month: 99% general aviation and 1% air taxi.

References

External links 
 

Airports in Utah
Buildings and structures in Emery County, Utah
Transportation in Emery County, Utah